Sesser may refer to:
Sesser (grape), a Romanian/Moldovan wine grape variety that is also known as Băbească neagră
Sesser, Illinois